Belmont Park is a neighborhood in the city of Long Beach, California.

It is located north of Belmont Shore and east of Belmont Heights, Long Beach, California. It continues the street pattern of Belmont Shore, set at an angle to the cardinal directions, with a curvilinear twist that Belmont Shore lacks. Belmont Park abuts Alamitos Bay and Long Beach Marine Stadium, with Naples across the water to the southeast.

Gov. George Deukmejian resided in the neighborhood for over 51 years.

See also
Neighborhoods of Long Beach, California

References

Long Beach, California